Dipsas andiana is a non-venomous snake found in Ecuador.

References

Dipsas
Snakes of South America
Endemic fauna of Ecuador
Reptiles of Ecuador
Reptiles described in 1896
Taxa named by George Albert Boulenger